Jay Ayres (born February 25, 1986 in Valrico, Florida) is an American soccer defender.

Ayres played college soccer at Belmont University, and for Nashville Metros in the USL Premier Development League, before being signed by the San Jose Earthquakes.

Ayres made his full professional debut for the Earthquakes on 30 April 2008, in a US Open Cup first-round game against Real Salt Lake.

References

1986 births
Living people
People from Valrico, Florida
Charleston Battery players
Nashville Metros players
San Jose Earthquakes players
USL First Division players
USL League Two players
Belmont Bruins men's soccer players
Soccer players from Florida
Association football defenders
American soccer players
Sportspeople from Hillsborough County, Florida